Mount Krebs is a prominent rock peak,  high, surmounting the central part of the main ridge of Lillie Range,  north of Mount Daniel, in the foothills of the Prince Olav Mountains, Antarctica. It was discovered by the U.S. Ross Ice Shelf Traverse Party (1957–58) under A.P. Crary, and named by him for Commander Manson Krebs, U.S. Navy, helicopter and airplane pilot of U.S. Navy Squadron VX-6 during Operation Deep Freeze.

References

Mountains of the Ross Dependency
Dufek Coast